Little Falls/Morrison County Airport , also known as Lindbergh Field, is a public airport located two miles (3 km) south of the central business district of Little Falls, a city in Morrison County, Minnesota, United States. It is owned by the City of Little Falls and Morrison County.

The airport opened in May 1947 as the Little Falls Municipal Airport. In 1964, the city and Morrison County signed a joint powers agreement and changed its name to the Little Falls/Morrison County Airport. A newer terminal building was erected in 1996.

Although most U.S. airports use the same three-letter location identifier for the FAA and IATA, Little Falls/Morrison County Airport is assigned LXL by the FAA but has no designation from the IATA.

On July 9, 2019 A FAA Airport Improvement Program grant of $371,724 was announced to construct a taxiway.  On November 22, 2019, the Federal Aviation Administration announced it had awarded an Airport Improvement Program grant of $2.1 million to the Little Falls/Morrison County Airport-Lindbergh Field to construct a new runway.

Facilities and aircraft 

For the 12-month period ending August 31, 2006, the airport had 22,450 aircraft operations, an average of 61 per day: 98% general aviation, 2% air taxi and <1% military. At that time there were 43 aircraft based at this airport: 96% single-engine, 2% helicopter and 2% ultralight.

References

External links 

Airports in Minnesota
Buildings and structures in Morrison County, Minnesota
Transportation in Morrison County, Minnesota